Bad Hair Day is a Disney Channel Original Movie which premiered on February 13, 2015, starring Laura Marano and Leigh-Allyn Baker. The story centers on 16-year-old Monica Reeves, who is running for Prom Queen at her high school. One day, she wakes up with crazy hair after combining loads of different products. But Monica soon has bigger things to worry about when ex-police Lieutenant Elizabeth "Liz" Morgan arrives at Monica’s door in search of a $7 million diamond necklace. The two become unlikely friends as they race to fix Monica’s hair for prom and protect the necklace from falling into the hands of a world-renewed jewel thief, Pierce Peters.

Plot

Monica, a high school tech whiz, is determined to become prom queen and is planning to go to MIT or a state university. She prepares herself the day before prom so she can save time when it comes, and thinks nothing will go wrong. On the big day, however, she wakes up with a bad hair day, and everything that can go wrong does: Her prom dress is destroyed, and her shoes break.

Monica answers the door to a woman claiming to be an FBI agent. The woman, Liz, seeks a necklace that Monica purchased at an antique shop, wanting to recover it and get her job back. In verifying Liz's credentials, Monica discovers that Liz is not actually an FBI agent but a private investigator. Monica smartly deduces Liz's claim, and she coaxes Liz into giving her a ride around town to fix her hair, replace her outfit, and take her to get driving lessons in exchange for the necklace.

Prom day goes from bad to worse as the pair is pursued by Pierce Peters, an intelligent British jewel thief who is also pursuing the diamond to give it to a buyer. Meanwhile, Monica finds that she cannot get an appointment to fix her hair or replace her dress and shoes. Furthermore, her supposed boyfriend Kyle has been cheating on her with her school rival, Ashley, who is also running for prom queen.

After Liz tries to retaliate by scaring Monica's boyfriend with an arrest on trumped-up charges, Liz gets arrested and Monica learns that Liz is a suspended police officer who has been scolded by the police chief from her department who is also her mother after her previous failures in catching Pierce. While Liz is being scolded, Monica meets her former partner, Ed.

Afterward, Liz confesses that the necklace had a priceless diamond that was on display at a museum that was stolen by Peters, a crime she felt guilty for allowing to take place, as she believed that she could handle it without calling for backup. The diamond was on the verge of being sold to a shady buyer wearing "the safari look," but was passed along to someone else by mistake with a similar look and subsequently lost in various exchanges.

When the time comes to take her driving lesson, Monica talks the instructor and Liz into letting them use her car, named Brando, when suddenly they encounter Pierce and are taken on a wild ride throughout the city. After Monica fails her driving lesson and Liz gets her car towed away, they argue over their predicament, splitting the two of them up. Pierce makes a phone call to Monica, informing her that he kidnapped her father. Monica and Liz work together to get the car back.

Arriving at Pierce's hideout, Liz states that she can't transfer to another police station to get away from the police chief because the police chief is her mother. Monica and Liz are lured into a trap by Pierce, but they outsmart him. After being tasered by Liz, Pierce is arrested by the police. Liz calls for backup.

In the end, Liz is reinstated on the force by her mother. Liz then sorts out Monica's hair and clothes. Monica and Liz go to the prom (with a full police procession), where Monica is told that she has been voted prom queen after her ex-boyfriend's infidelity went viral. Monica tells the crowd that being perfect is overrated, and all enjoy the night. She also decides to go to MIT.

Cast

 Laura Marano as Monica Reeves
 Leigh-Allyn Baker as Liz
 Christian Campbell as Pierce
 Alain Goulem as Monica's Dad 
 Christian Paul as Ed
 Kiana Madeira as Sierra 
 Jake Manley as Kyle Timmons
 Zoé De Grand Maison as Ashley 
 Susan Almgren as Chief Edna Morgan

Production
Filming occurred in the city of Montreal, Quebec.
In an interview with Variety, Baker said, "I wanted to executive produce because I wanted to see what it was like to build and fulfill a vision from the ground up, and since this was Disney Channel's first movie with an adult lead, I wanted that role to be protected and I wanted the movie to have my creative stamp on it." She also liked that she got to work on the Disney movie because it taps into her family unit fanbase. Marano also mentioned that it was her first DCOM. Filming took place in Montreal, standing in for an unnamed American city. Marano noted that in contrast to Austin & Ally which had four cameras and shot about ten scenes a day, the film shot with fewer cameras and fewer scenes, one of which took the entire day.

Marano said that she likes that her character embodies two normally contrasting high school cliches – a prom queen nominee who likes beauty and fashion and is popular, and a computer whiz who has a nerdy tech obsession and codes. She also likes that she relates with her character when deciding whether to go to the state college or MIT.

The film's soundtrack was composed by Michael Corriveau.  He mixed over 60 minutes of music with Sylvain Lefebvre of Lamajeure. According to the Lamajeure website, the soundtrack used pop, rhythmic and classical music. Corriveau worked with the Philharmonic Orchestra of Prague, and the recording was done at the Dvorak Hall at the Rudolfinum.

The feature song is "For the Ride" by Laura Marano. The song used in the trailer was "Nuthin'" by Lecrae. Other songs include: "Rooftop" by Skylar Stecker, "Colorful World" by Shayna Rose, "All Over The World" by The Fooo Conspiracy, "Happy Place" feat. Hanna Ashbook by Oh, Hush!, and "Heatroc" feat. Lazarus by Agzilla.

Broadcast
The film was first released on February 6, 2015 on WATCH Disney Channel, and had its premiere broadcast in the US on February 13. It premiered in Canada on the Family Channel on March 20, and in Australia on April 17.

Reception
Bad Hair Day delivered 4.0 million viewers for its television premiere and has had 435,000 views on the WATCH Disney Channel app since it was released on February 6. Amy Amatangelo of The Hollywood Reporter found the duo of Baker and Marano "played well off each other", and that Marano's character was "refreshingly age-appropriate". She found the movie to be goofy but not slapsticky, and that it was "like a junior version of Thelma and Louise albeit with a much, much happier ending."

References

External links

 Bad Hair Day at Muse Entertainment
 

2010s teen comedy films
2015 television films
2015 films
American teen comedy films
Disney Channel Original Movie films
Films shot in Montreal
Films directed by Érik Canuel
Films about the Federal Bureau of Investigation
2010s American films
2010s Canadian films
Canadian teen comedy films
Canadian comedy television films